North Carolina Highway 118 (NC 118) is an  primary state highway in the U.S. state of North Carolina. It runs east–west from NC 11 in Grifton to NC 43 in Vanceboro.

Route description
A two-lane rural highway, it traverses  through mostly farmland, as it connects the towns of Grifton and Vanceboro. The highway begins at a stop-controlled intersection with the divided NC 11 just outside of the town limits of Grifton in Lenoir County. NC 118 heads east along West Contentnea Drive through farmland for  then enters Grifton and passes through small residential neighborhood for another . At an intersection with South Highland Boulevard, NC 118 turns to the northeast along this road and crosses the Contentnea Creek into Pitt County and downtown Grifton. It makes a turn towards the southeast at Queen Street where NC 118 heads through the town's central business district. After curving slowly to due east, the road heads through another residential neighborhood of Grifton before exiting the town for a more rural area. One small settlement in Pitt County through which NC 118 passes is Quinerly where some houses and streets line the south side of the road.

NC 118 heads towards the southeast again where it enters Craven County, again in a mostly rural area. It curves to the east where it passes through an unnamed settlement (at the intersection of Honolulu Road and Bay Bush Road) containing some churches, cemeteries, and a farm and garden store. The road makes one more drop towards the southeast passing another unnamed settlement with houses and churches before curving one last time to the east at wooded marshland containing Swift Creek. NC 118 ends at an intersection with NC 43 within a small annexed portion of Vanceboro. The road continues east as state-maintained Dawson Lane (Secondary Road 1654) to end about  later at U.S. Route 17 Business.

History
Established in 1932 as a new primary routing, it initially ran from U.S. Route 70 (US 70)/NC 10 (now NC 55) in Fort Barnwell to NC 43 in Vanceboro.  Around 1940, it was rerouted to a new western terminus at NC 11 in Grifton. In 1969, it was extended west over an old section of NC 11 and Grifton Hugo Road to its current western terminus of NC 11.

Junction list

References

External links

NCRoads.com: N.C. 118

Transportation in Lenoir County, North Carolina
Transportation in Pitt County, North Carolina
Transportation in Craven County, North Carolina
118